Sébastien Le Toux (born 10 January 1984) is a French retired professional footballer who spent the majority of his career in Major League Soccer, including six seasons at Philadelphia Union.

A versatile attacker, who in 2010 became Philadelphia's first All-Star representative, was widely regarded as one of the hardest workers in the league, winning the MLS Individual Fair Play Award in both 2010 and 2011. Le Toux racked up over 263 career MLS appearances with 59 goals and 57 assists in nine years.

Playing career

Club
Le Toux was part of the youth setup at Rennes, and briefly played for Lorient in Ligue 2, prior to moving to the United States.

Seattle Sounders FC
Le Toux unsuccessfully tried out for MLS side FC Dallas, before eventually signing with the Seattle Sounders of the USL First Division in early 2007. Le Toux netted 10 goals for the Sounders in 2007, tying him with Charles Gbeke of the Montreal Impact as the division's top goal-scorer; he went on to score 24 goals in 54 league appearances for the team. On 28 September 2007, Le Toux became Seattle's fourth USL First Division Most Valuable Player.

On 8 May 2008, Le Toux was the first player signed by the Seattle Sounders FC following their expansion into Major League Soccer.

He scored the first goal in a 1–1 draw against the Los Angeles Galaxy, but saw more success in the Lamar Hunt U.S. Open Cup on the run to the 2009 Open Cup Final and had an assist on the winning goal to Roger Levesque in the 2–1 victory at RFK Stadium against D.C. United.

Philadelphia Union
Le Toux was not among Seattle's protected 11 players for the 2009 MLS Expansion Draft and was selected by Philadelphia Union. He scored a hat trick in the Philadelphia Union's first official home match in Major League Soccer as the Union defeated D.C. United 3–2. He scored his 10th goal of the season in the 33rd minute for the Union, taking a pass from rookie Danny Mwanga and sending a clean shot past Wizards goalkeeper Jimmy Nielsen. Le Toux scored on a penalty deep into stoppage time to give the Philadelphia Union a 2–1 win over Toronto FC. He scored once again against his former club Seattle Sounders, trailing 1–0 entering the second half, Le Toux got the equalizer on a penalty kick in the 54th minute. He finished the 2010 MLS season with 14 league goals. On 8 June, Le Toux was named a nominee for the Major League Soccer All-Star Game.

On 18 January 2012, he wrote "on a jet plane to England" the day after Bolton Wanderers manager Owen Coyle confirmed that the striker was having a trial with the Premier League side. The trial, however, did not lead to a contract offer.

Vancouver Whitecaps FC 

On 31 January 2012, Philadelphia traded Le Toux to Vancouver Whitecaps FC for allocation money. Le Toux scored four minutes into his MLS debut for the Whitecaps on 10 March, a 2–0 home victory over new side Montreal Impact.

New York Red Bulls
Le Toux was traded to New York Red Bulls on 13 July 2012 in exchange for Dane Richards and allocation money. He scored 24 minutes into his first game with the Red Bulls vs. Seattle Sounders on 15 July 2012 in a match that ended in a 2–2 draw. In his second game, the 1–0 home win against Chicago Fire, Le Toux got the assist for a goal from Thierry Henry with a cross-field ball to the striker.

Return to Philadelphia
On 6 December 2012 Le Toux was traded back to Philadelphia Union in a sign-and-trade from New York Red Bulls. Philadelphia sent allocation money along with Josué Martínez to New York. He scored in the 17th minute of his debut back with the Philadelphia Union and the 2013 Major League Soccer season opener, doing so two years in a row.

Colorado Rapids
On 3 August 2016, Le Toux was traded to the Colorado Rapids in exchange for General Allocation Money.

D.C. United
On 24 January 2017, Le Toux was signed to D.C. United as a free agent. He scored his first goal for DC against the New England Revolution on 22 April 2017. In the next game, he would score his second and last goal for DC against Atlanta United FC on 30 April 2017. Le Toux and United mutually agreed to terminate his contract on 17 August 2017.

Retirement
In May 2018, Le Toux announced his retirement from professional soccer. Making a name for himself as a top player for the Philadelphia Union, Le Toux signed a ceremonial one-day contract to retire as a Philadelphia player. His retirement ceremony was held on 23 June 2018 during a home match against Vancouver Whitecaps, where he was the first inductee into the Union's Ring of Honor.

Post playing career
After his retirement from professional soccer, Le Toux founded Le Toux Soccer Development in 2018; a private soccer coaching service he owns and operates.

During the 2019 season, Le Toux made his broadcast debut providing pregame, halftime, and postgame commentary during Philadelphia Union matches.

Currently, Le Toux is the Head Coach for the Shipley School Girls' Varsity Soccer team.

Personal
Le Toux was born and raised in Rennes, France. He has two brothers and one sister.

On 5 August 2010, it was announced that Le Toux has received a United States green card, making him a permanent resident of the country and qualifying him as a domestic player for MLS roster purposes.

Career statistics

Source: Soccerway Stats

Honors

Club
Stade Rennes Youth
Coupe Gambardella: 2002–03

Seattle Sounders FC
Lamar Hunt U.S. Open Cup: 2009
USL First Division Championship: 2007
USL First Division Commissioner's Cup: 2007

Individual
USL First Division Top Scorer: 2007
Major League Soccer All Star Team: 2010
MLS Fair Play Award: 2010, 2011
MLS Best XI: 2010
Philadelphia Union: Ring of Honor 2018

References

External links
 
 Bell, Jack. "A Frenchman Finds His Place, and His Position, in Seattle," The New York Times, Tuesday, 3 March 2009.

1984 births
Living people
People from Mont-Saint-Aignan
Association football forwards
Association football wingers
French footballers
Stade Rennais F.C. players
FC Lorient players
Seattle Sounders (1994–2008) players
Seattle Sounders FC players
Philadelphia Union players
Vancouver Whitecaps FC players
New York Red Bulls players
Colorado Rapids players
D.C. United players
Ligue 2 players
USL First Division players
Major League Soccer players
French expatriate footballers
French expatriate sportspeople in the United States
Expatriate soccer players in the United States
Expatriate soccer players in Canada
Major League Soccer All-Stars
French expatriate sportspeople in Canada
Sportspeople from Seine-Maritime
Footballers from Normandy